RP2040 is a 32-bit dual ARM Cortex-M0+ microcontroller integrated circuit by Raspberry Pi Ltd (previously "Raspberry Pi Trading Ltd").  At the same time, in January 2021, it was released as part of the Raspberry Pi Pico board.

Overview
Announced on 21st January 2021, the RP2040 is the first microcontroller designed by Raspberry Pi Ltd (previously "Raspberry Pi Trading Ltd"). The microcontroller can be programmed in Assembly, C/C++, FreePascal, Rust, Go, MicroPython, and CircuitPython. It is powerful enough to run TensorFlow Lite.

At announcement time four other manufacturers (Adafruit, Pimoroni, Arduino, SparkFun) were at advanced stages of their product design, awaiting the widespread availability of chips to be put in to production. SparkFun and Adafruit have since released products based around the RP2040.

Hackaday notes the benefits of the RP2040 as being from Raspberry Pi, having a good feature set, and being released in low-cost packages.

Per the datasheet, there are multiple revisions of the chip:"The full source for the RP2040 bootROM can be found at https://github.com/raspberrypi/pico-bootrom. This includes both version 1 and version 2 of the bootROM, which correspond to the B0 and B1 silicon revisions, respectively."

Features
The chip is 40nm silicon in a 7 × 7 mm QFN-56 surface mount device (SMD) package.
 Key features: 
 133 MHz dual ARM Cortex-M0+ cores (can be overclocked to over 400 MHz)
 Each core has an integer divider peripheral, and two interpolators.
 264 KB SRAM in six independent banks
 No internal flash or EEPROM memory (after reset, the boot-loader loads firmware from either external flash memory or USB bus into internal SRAM)
 QSPI bus controller, supporting up to 16 MB of external flash memory
 DMA controller
 AHB crossbar, fully-connected
 On-chip programmable low-dropout regulator (LDO) to generate core voltage
 2 on-chip PLLs to generate USB and core clocks
 30 GPIO pins, of which 4 can optionally be used as analog inputs
 Peripherals:
 2 UARTs
 2 SPI controllers
 2 I²C controllers
 16 PWM channels
 USB 1.1 controller and PHY, with host and device support
 8 programmed input–output (PIO) state machines

Boards
A number of manufacturers have announced their own boards using the RP2040. A selection of the growing number is here:

See also
 Arduino - a popular microcontroller board family
 ESP32 - a series of low-cost, low-power system on a chip microcontrollers with integrated Wi-Fi and dual-mode Bluetooth.
 STM32 - a family of 32-bit microcontroller integrated circuits
 Raspberry Pi - Raspberry Pi's series of small single board computers
 Thumby (Game Console) - A thumb-sized micro-console powered by the RP2040

References

External links

 Official webpage
 Official documentation

Raspberry Pi
ARM-based microcontrollers
British inventions
Computer science education in the United Kingdom
Educational hardware
Products introduced in 2021